The 2014 Stanford Cardinal football team represented Stanford University in the 2014 NCAA Division I FBS football season. The Cardinal were led by fourth-year head coach David Shaw. They played their home games at Stanford Stadium and were members of the North Division of the Pac-12 Conference. They finished the season 8–5, 5–4 in Pac-12 play to finish in second place in the North Division. They were invited to the Foster Farms Bowl where they defeated Maryland.

Previous season

The Cardinal won the conference title for the second year in a row after defeating Arizona State in the Pac-12 Football Championship Game, and represented the Pac-12 in the Rose Bowl, losing to Michigan State 24–20. The game represented Stanford's first consecutive Rose Bowl appearances since 1971–1972 and its fourth consecutive appearance in a BCS bowl game, the only team to do so from 2011 to 2014.

2014 recruiting class
Casey Tucker (#5 OT, Chandler, AZ, Hamilton High School, 6'6", 290)
Keller Chryst (#3 QB-PP, Palo Alto, CA, Palo Alto High School, 6'4", 234)
Dalton Schultz (#1 TE-Y, South Jordan, UT, Bingham High School, 6'6", 235)
Christian McCaffrey (#26 ATH, Highlands Ranch, CO, Valor Christian High School, 6'0" ,195)
Brandon Simmons (#14 S, Arlington, TX, Mansfield Timberview High School, 6'1", 182)
Joey Alfieri (#34 OLB, Portland, OR, Jesuit High School, 6'2", 230)
Jordan Perez (#36 OLB, Carlsbad, CA, Carlsbad High School, 6'1", 210)
Bobby Okereke (#51 ATH, Tustin, CA, Foothill High School, 6'1", 213)
Alijah Holder (#45 S, Oceanside, CA, Oceanside High School, 6'1", 165)
Austin Hall (#40 OG, Phoenix, AZ, Brophy Prep, 6'5", 295)
Daniel Marx (#3 FB, Mission Viejo, CA, Mission Viejo High School, 6'3", 238)
Harrison Phillips (#77 DE, Omaha, NE, Millard West High School, 6'4", 240)
Denzel Franklin (#63 S, Atlanta, GA, Pace Academy, 6'0", 182)
Lane Veach (#100 OLB, Chandler, AZ, Perry High School, 6'5", 220)
Isaiah Brandt-Sims (#120 RB, Wenatchee, WA, Wenatchee High School, 5'11", 185)
Uriah Leiataua (#104 DE, Compton, CA, Dominguez High School, 6'3", 232)
Alameen Murphy (#108 S, Fort Washington, MD, Friendly High School,  5'10", 182)

Personnel

Coaching staff
 David Shaw – head coach (Bradford M. Freeman Director of Football)
 Lance Anderson – Defensive Coordinator (Willie Shaw Director of Defense)
 Mike Bloomgren – Offensive Coordinator/Offensive Line (Andrew Luck Director of Offense), Associate Head Coach
 Pete alamar – Special Teams Coordinator
 Duane Akina – Defensive Backs
 Tavita Pritchard – Quarterbacks/Wide Receivers/Recruiting Coordinator
 Randy Hart – Defensive Line
 Peter Hansen – Inside Linebackers
 Lance Taylor – Running Backs
 Morgan turner – Tight Ends
 Jarrett huk – Defensive Assistant
 Derek Belch – Special Teams Graduate Assistant
 Greg mangan – Defensive Graduate Assistant
 Marc mattioli – Defensive Graduate Assistant
 Joseph ashfield – Offensive Assistant
 Tsuyoshi kawata – Offensive Assistant
 Timot lamarre – Offensive Assistant
 Ron lynn – Director of Player Development
 Shannon turley – Kissick Family Director of Football Sports Performance
 Steve bartlinski – Head Football Athletic Trainer

Roster

Schedule

Source:

Game summaries

UC Davis

No.14 USC

Army

at Washington

at No. 9 Notre Dame (Legends Trophy)

Washington State

at No. 17 Arizona State

Oregon State

at No. 5 Oregon

Utah

California

at No. 9 UCLA

vs. Maryland (Foster Farms Bowl)

Rankings

Statistics

Scores by quarter

Awards and honors

Players of the week

Following each week's games, Pac-12 conference officials select the players of the week from the conference's teams.

Week 5 (Sept. 29) Peter Kalambayi, LB
Week 7 (Oct. 13) Ty Montgomery, WR

All-American Selections

Offense
Andrus Peat, OL  (TSN, ESPN, SI)

All-Pac-12 Conference Team Selections

*Numbers in parentheses (2) indicate multiple All-Pac-12 Team Conference selections for that individual.

References

Stanford
Stanford Cardinal football seasons
Redbox Bowl champion seasons
Stanford Cardinal football